The Bijeljina and Modran shootings was a mass shooting event that occurred on 2 February 1992, at Bijeljina and Modran, in then Yugoslavia. Drago Miličić shot and killed six people.

Shooting
On the night of 2 February 1992, Yugoslav People's Army conscript Drago Miličić got drunk in a cafe in Modran, where he smashed several ashtrays with a knife before returning to his barracks. There he found a rifle and shot his commander and two privates as they slept. He then threw grenades at security posts, stole a car, and returned to Modran, where he shot his girlfriend's mother, father and brother. He barricaded himself in their house before surrendering to police a few hours later.

Perpetrator
At age 20, Miličić had been drafted into the army four and a half months before the shooting. During a medical examination before conscription, the psychiatrist noted that he was emotionally immature and that he had an anxiety-depression disorder, but that this was not a sufficient reason to prevent his enrollment in the army. Lieutenant Dragoslav Radovanovic, Miličić's superior and subsequent victim, had tried in early October 1991 to inform his superiors that Miličić should be released due to mental issues. His claims were ignored at the time, and Miličić remained in the army.

References

1992 mass shootings in Europe
Family murders
Mass shootings in Yugoslavia
Spree shootings in Europe